Rzepiennik may refer to the following places in Poland:

Rzepiennik Biskupi
Rzepiennik Marciszewski
Rzepiennik Strzyżewski
Rzepiennik Suchy